Terry is a biopic of Canadian amputee athlete Terry Fox, dramatizing his national Marathon of Hope run across Canada to raise money for cancer research. The film, produced by Shaftesbury Films, aired as a television movie on CTV in 2005. It was written by Dennis Foon and directed by Don McBrearty, and was created in part because the earlier 1983 film The Terry Fox Story had been criticized by Fox's family for inaccurately depicting his personality.

Shawn Ashmore portrays Fox. Unlike Eric Fryer, who previously portrayed Fox in The Terry Fox Story, Ashmore is not an amputee. For some scenes, a real amputee body double was used, while in others, digital editing was used to superimpose a prosthesis over Ashmore's real leg.

The film's cast also includes Matt Gordon as Fox's publicist Bill Vigars, Catherine Disher and David Huband as Fox's parents Betty and Rolly, and Noah Reid as his brother Darrell.

The film concludes with a mixed montage of footage of the actual Terry Fox and the film version to the music of "Turnaround" by Stan Rogers.



Cast
Shawn Ashmore as Terry Fox
Ryan McDonald as Doug Alward
Noah Reid as Darrell Fox
Matt Gordon as Bill Vigars
Catherine Disher as Betty Fox
David Huband as Rolly Fox
Adam Butcher as Chad
David Keeley as Bobby Orr
Shannon Lawson as Mrs. Jones
Vivien Endicott-Douglas as Judy Fox

Background 
Terry is based on Terry Fox, who had cancer in his legs, leading to one of his legs being amputated. He embarked on a 143 day run, covering 5,373 kilometres across Canada. After 10 months of his marathon, Fox died on June 28, 1981. He left the legacy of the Terry Fox Run in over 60 countries which has raised more than $360 million for cancer research. Canada has honoured Fox's name by putting him on a stamp, in fact, he was the first person in Canadian history to be put on a stamp without being dead for 10 years. Canada also commemorated him by putting him on a collective dollar in 2005.

Production 
Terry was directed by Emmy Award winning Don McBrearty. The TV movie cost $4 million to produce and took a duration of 21 days to film, over the summer. The cast and crew quickly learned the struggles that Fox went through during his marathon. In an article published by The Globe and Mail McBrearty stated, "We filmed in intense heat and we were exhausted just trying to retrace his steps. And we didn't run the daily marathon that Terry did. He started most mornings at 5 and went to bed by 8 o'clock. But as events progressed and he got into Ontario, when he became more popular, he had to go to receptions, sometimes two or three in a night. None of us can figure out how he did it, running 26 miles every day. It's hard to fathom." Shawn Ashmore who depicts Terry Fox in the film also went through difficulties trying to portray Fox accurately. Due to Fox only having one leg and a prosthetic leg, Ashmore's leg was removed in post production digitally. He stated in the same article from The Globe and Mail that, "The roughest part is the physicality, learning the skip-hop to make it real, and remembering and knowing the movement." He has stated that didn't want to harm Fox's legacy and did so by training very hard and getting into shape for all of the running that would be required for filming.

Release 
Terry was released in Canada on September 11, 2005. It was also released in Hungary on the 21st of September in 2006 and in the UK on February 25 in 2007.

References

External links

2005 television films
2005 films
2000s biographical drama films
Canadian biographical drama films
Canadian drama television films
Drama films based on actual events
English-language Canadian films
Films about amputees
Athletics films
Running films
Biographical films about sportspeople
Cultural depictions of track and field athletes
Cultural depictions of Canadian men
Films about cancer
Terry Fox
2005 drama films
2006 drama films
2006 films
2007 drama films
2007 films
Films directed by Don McBrearty
2000s Canadian films